Hae Buru (86 – 48 BCE) was king of Bukbuyeo and founder of Dongbuyeo (86 BCE – 22 CE), an ancient Korean kingdom.

Hae Buru took the throne and became the king of Bukbuyeo. Hae Buru led his followers and some of Bukbuyeo people to the city of Gaseopwon, a city near the Sea of Japan (East Korean Sea). In that same year, Hae Buru founded another Buyeo, which he named Dongbuyeo, due to its position east of Bukbuyeo.

According to the Samguk Yusa, Aranbul, a minister of the Buyeo court, had a dream in which the Heavenly Emperor told him that Buyeo was to make way for the descendants of Heaven, and believing that the dream was a sort of omen, he advised his king Buru to move the capital. Buru later moved his capital to Gaseopwon((迦葉原), and named his country Dongbuyeo.

Hae Buru's wives apparently were not able to produce a male heir for Hae Buru until he was in old age. Hae Buru eventually got a son, Geumwa, of whom he trained and grew into his successor. When Hae Buru died in 48 BCE, Geumwa rose to the throne by proclaiming himself "King of Dongbuyeo."

In popular culture
 Portrayed by Park Geun-hyung in the 2006-2007 MBC TV series Jumong.

See also 
 List of Korean monarchs
 History of Korea
 Dongbuyeo

References

History of Korea
Buyeo rulers
1st-century BC rulers in Asia
Year of birth unknown
48 BC deaths
1st-century BC Korean people
Founding monarchs